The Paru de Oeste River (Erepecuru River) is a tributary of the Trombetas River in Pará in north-central Brazil.

Geography
In addition to the main river, it has a "loop" known as the Cuminá River, which finally merges into the Paru de Oeste River about  before the latter merges into the Trombetas.  The confluence of Paru de Oeste and Trombetas is almost  upriver from the city of Oriximiná.

The river basin lies partly within the  Grão-Pará Ecological Station, the largest fully protected tropical forest conservation unit on the planet.

Further south it flows through the  Trombetas State Forest from north to south.

See also
List of rivers of Pará

References
Brazilian Ministry of Transport

Rivers of Pará